Bogy Run is a  long 1st order tributary to White Clay Creek in New Castle County, Delaware.

Variant names
According to the Geographic Names Information System, it has also been known historically as:  
Boogy Run

Course
Bogy Run rises on the Christina River divide in Newark in New Castle County, Delaware.  Bogy Run then flows southeast and then turns northeast to meet White Clay Creek at Newark, Delaware.

Watershed
Bogy Run drains  of area, receives about 46.0 in/year of precipitation, has a topographic wetness index of 430.04 and is about 10.8% forested.

See also
List of rivers of Delaware

References 

Rivers of Delaware
Rivers of New Castle County, Delaware